Tadaoki (written: 忠興) is a masculine Japanese given name. Notable people with the name include:

 (1563–1646), Japanese daimyō
 (1715–1764), Japanese daimyō

Japanese masculine given names